Glaize Creek (also called Grand Glaize Creek) is a stream in Jefferson County in the U.S. state of Missouri. It is a tributary of the Mississippi River. The stream headwaters arise at  just east of Missouri Route 21.

Glaize Creek derives its name from the French words denoting "red earth".

See also
List of rivers of Missouri

References

Rivers of Jefferson County, Missouri
Rivers of Missouri